1961 Albanian Cup was the twelfth season of Albania's annual cup competition. It began in Spring 1961 with the First Round and ended in May 1961 with the Final matches. Dinamo Tirana were the defending champions, having won their sixth Albanian Cup last season.

The cup was won by Partizani.

The rounds were played in a two-legged format similar to those of European competitions. If the aggregated score was tied after both games, the team with the higher number of away goals advanced. If the number of away goals was equal in both games, the match was decided by extra time and a penalty shootout, if necessary.

First round
Games were played in March 1961*

 Results unknown

Second round
All sixteen teams of the 1960 Superliga and First Division entered in this round. First and second legs were played in March 1961.

|}
+ Labinoti won by corners.

Quarter-finals
In this round entered the 8 winners from the previous round.

|}

Semi-finals
In this round entered the four winners from the previous round.

|}

Finals
In this round entered the two winners from the previous round.

|}

References

 Calcio Mondiale Web

External links
 Official website 

Cup
1961 domestic association football cups
1961